Roman Vlach (born June 21, 1989) is a Czech professional ice hockey player. He is currently playing with HC Plzeň in the Czech Extraliga.

Vlach first played with HC Zlín in the Czech Extraliga during the 2007–08 Czech Extraliga season.

References

External links

1989 births
Living people
Czech ice hockey forwards
HC Bílí Tygři Liberec players
LHK Jestřábi Prostějov players
HC Karlovy Vary players
HC Oceláři Třinec players
HC Olomouc players
PSG Berani Zlín players
Sportspeople from Zlín
HC Plzeň players
VHK Vsetín players